The Schenevus Creek is a river located in southern Otsego County, New York. The creek flows through Worcester and Schenevus before converging with the Susquehanna River in Colliersville, New York.

References

Rivers of New York (state)
Rivers of Otsego County, New York